Wilford Russell "Squibb" Wilson (October 6, 1913 – 1986) was an American football, basketball, and baseball coach and athletic director at Fairmont State University.

He also served as member of West Virginia House of Delegates from Marion County during three separate terms (1957–58, 1961–64, 1967–68).

References

External links
 Fairmont State Hall of Fame profile
 

1913 births
1986 deaths
20th-century American politicians
Basketball coaches from West Virginia
Fairmont State Fighting Falcons athletic directors
Fairmont State Fighting Falcons baseball coaches
Fairmont State Fighting Falcons football coaches
Fairmont State Fighting Falcons men's basketball coaches
Members of the West Virginia House of Delegates
People from Fairview, West Virginia